Emme Thammanna is a 1966 Indian Kannada-language film produced and directed by B. R. Panthulu. It stars Rajkumar, Dikki Madhava Rao, Bharathi Vishnuvardhan. The supporting cast features Narasimharaju, Subbanna, Krishna Shastry, B. R. Panthulu, Papamma, Jaya and M. V. Rajamma. The film was remade in Telugu as Govula Gopanna (1968), in Hindi as Jigri Dost (1969) and in Tamil as Mattukara Velan (1970).

Plot

Cast

Soundtrack 
T. G. Lingappa composed the soundtrack, and lyrics were written by G. V. Iyer. The album consists of seven soundtracks.

References

External links 
 

1960s Kannada-language films
1966 films
Films directed by B. R. Panthulu
Films scored by T. G. Lingappa
Kannada films remade in other languages